Kazimierz Kaszuba (5 April 1930 – 5 August 1990) was a Polish footballer who competed in the 1952 Summer Olympics.

References

1930 births
1990 deaths
Association football defenders
Poland international footballers
Polish footballers
Olympic footballers of Poland
Footballers at the 1952 Summer Olympics
MKS Cracovia (football) players
People from Kraków County
Sportspeople from Lesser Poland Voivodeship
Wawel Kraków players